Petrocodon albinervius is a species of flowering plant in the genus Petrocodon found in limestone areas in southwestern Guangxi.

References

albinervius
Flora of Guangxi
Plants described in 2021